The Writers' Guild of Norway is an association of Norwegian dramatists and playwrights. It was established in 1938, to protect Norwegian playwrights' professional and economic interests. In 2007 the association had around 250 members.

References

External links
Writers' Guild of Norway

Organisations based in Oslo
Organizations established in 1938
Norwegian writers' organisations
Norwaco
Trade unions in Norway